Maxwell Edward Seidman (April 18, 1898 – November 17, 1950) was an American lawyer and politician affiliated with the Democratic Party.

Early life and education 
Seidman was born in Philadelphia in 1898, the son of Russian-Jewish immigrants Isaac and Jennie Seidman. By the time of Seidman's birth, his father was working as a real estate agent. He attended South Philadelphia High School and the Wharton School of the University of Pennsylvania. After Wharton, Seidman stayed at Penn for law school, graduating in the 1920s and starting his own practice.

Career 
Initially a Republican, Seidman joined the Democratic Party in 1933 as a part of John B. Kelly, Sr.'s "independent Democratic" faction. When Democrat George Howard Earle III was elected governor in 1934, he appointed Seidman as a special deputy attorney general, working with the state banking department and the state board of motion picture censors.

Seidman became the Democratic leader of the 1st ward and, in 1949, was nominated for Philadelphia City Council in a special election to fill a vacancy created by the death of Republican councilman Frank X. O'Connor. Seidman won, narrowly defeating his Republican opponent, Roman Catholic High School football coach Joseph A. Graham, Jr. He joined Harry Norwitch as one of only two Democrats in the 22-member council.

Personal life 
Seidman's tenure on City Council was brief. While visiting New York City on November 17, 1950, he suffered a heart attack and died at the age of 53. He was buried in Mount Sharon Cemetery in Springfield, Delaware County, Pennsylvania.

References

Sources

 
 
 
 

1898 births
1950 deaths
Jewish American people in Pennsylvania politics
Lawyers from Philadelphia
Pennsylvania Democrats
Philadelphia City Council members
University of Pennsylvania Law School alumni
Wharton School of the University of Pennsylvania alumni
20th-century American politicians
20th-century American lawyers
American people of Russian-Jewish descent
20th-century American Jews